Al Aaroui (Tarifit: Ɛaawi, ⵄⴰⴰⵡⵉ; Arabic: العروي) is a town in Nador Province, Oriental, Morocco. According to the 2014 census, it has a population of 47 578.

Notable people
Ahmed Jahouh - Professional footballer.

See also
Massacre of Monte Arruit

References

Populated places in Nador Province